The Women's 4 × 100 metre medley relay competition at the 2017 Summer Universiade was held on 26 August 2017.

Records
Prior to the competition, the existing world and Universiade records were as follows.

Results

Heats
The heats were held at 10:00.

Final 
The final was held at 20:21.

References

Women's 4 x 100 metre medley relay